Paul Gurner Maholm (pronounced Mah-HALL-uhm; born June 25, 1982) is an American former professional baseball pitcher. He played in Major League Baseball (MLB) for the Pittsburgh Pirates, Chicago Cubs, Atlanta Braves and Los Angeles Dodgers.

Early life
Paul Gurner Maholm was born on June 25, 1982 in Holly Springs, Mississippi. He played golf at the Holly Springs Country Club as a teenager.

Maholm graduated from Germantown High School in Germantown, Tennessee. He was a three-year letterman while pitching at Mississippi State University for the Bulldogs.

Professional career

Pittsburgh Pirates
Maholm was selected by the Pittsburgh Pirates in the first round (eighth overall) of the 2003 draft.

While playing in the minor leagues in 2004, Maholm was struck in the face by a line drive. This resulted in a badly broken nose and a shattered left orbital, requiring surgery to repair the damage.

Maholm made his major league debut as a starter, on August 30, 2005 against the Milwaukee Brewers and pitched eight shutout innings, earning his first career win. Maholm compiled a 3–1 record in six games with a 2.18 ERA in the 2005 season.

In 2006, Maholm made 30 starts for the Pirates, going 8–10 with a 4.76 ERA in 176 innings. He struck out 117 while walking a career high 81 and hitting 12 batters.

Maholm pitched his first shutout, while giving up three hits in a 3–0 victory over the Houston Astros on April 24, 2007. The rest of his season went sour, finishing 10–15 in 29 starts. He minimized his walk total from the previous year, inducing just 49 walks in 177.2 innings.

2008 proved to be one of Maholm's best seasons as a starting pitcher. Despite not reaching double digit wins in 31 starts (9–9), he lowered his ERA by more than a run from the previous year, finishing with a 3.79 ERA in a career-high 206.1 innings. In a spring training game against the Yankees that year, he faced Billy Crystal in the comedian's lone at-bat. Crystal fouled off the second pitch down the first-base line, but ultimately struck out.

After the 2008 season, Maholm signed a three-year contract extension worth a guaranteed $14.5 million and a team option for 2012.

In 2009, Maholm hit his first major league home run, off the Mets' John Maine. He finished 2009 with a record of 8–9, 4.44 ERA, 14 home runs allowed, 6 hit batsmen, 60 walks, 119 strikeouts, .290 average against, a 1.44 walks and hits per innings pitched, in 194.2 innings pitched.

Maholm reverted to his 2007 performance in 2010, finishing with a record of 9–15 with a career high 5.10 ERA.

In 2011, Maholm had a stint on the DL, missing more than 3 starts on the season. He finished 6–14 despite having an ERA of 3.66 and allowing just 11 home runs.

Chicago Cubs
On January 10, 2012, Maholm signed a one-year, $4.75 million contract with the Chicago Cubs with an option for a second year. He was 9–6 with a 3.74 ERA in 20 starts.

Atlanta Braves
Maholm was traded to the Atlanta Braves on July 30, 2012 with Reed Johnson for Arodys Vizcaino and Jaye Chapman. He was 14–16 with a 4.14 ERA over  seasons.

Los Angeles Dodgers
On February 8, 2014, Maholm signed a one-year, $1.5 million contract with the Los Angeles Dodgers. He started eight games for the Dodgers because of various injuries but spent most of his time in the bullpen as a long reliever. In 30 games he had a 4.84 ERA and a 1–5 record. In a game on August 1 against the Chicago Cubs, he tore his anterior cruciate ligament in his right knee and was lost for the season.

Cincinnati Reds
On February 1, 2015, Maholm signed a minor league deal with the Cincinnati Reds. Though he hoped to make the Reds as a starting pitcher, he wound up competing for a position in the bullpen. He was released on March 30.

Pitching style
Maholm throws a wide variety of pitches and with a great range of speeds. His lead pitch is a sinker in the 87–89 mph range. He also throws a four-seam fastball (87–90), changeup (80–83), cut fastball (83–86), slider (79–82), and curveball (70–75). Maholm uses the cutter and changeup almost exclusively on right-handed hitters, while the slider is used only on lefties. He throws his curveball to batters from both sides of the plate. In 2013, he added a slow curveball that ranges from 70 MPH to 62 MPH, that at times dips in the 50s.

References

External links

1982 births
Living people
Baseball players from Mississippi
Major League Baseball pitchers
Pittsburgh Pirates players
Chicago Cubs players
Atlanta Braves players
Los Angeles Dodgers players
Mississippi State Bulldogs baseball players
Williamsport Crosscutters players
Gulf Coast Pirates players
Hickory Crawdads players
Lynchburg Hillcats players
Altoona Curve players
Indianapolis Indians players
People from Greenwood, Mississippi
People from Germantown, Tennessee
People from Holly Springs, Mississippi
Rome Braves players